Mainé-Soroa (Maine-Soroa, Maïné-Soroa) is a town in southeastern Niger, the capital of the Mainé-Soroa Department, and is in turn part of Diffa Region. Population 10,176 (2001).

Economy
Situated in an agropastoral zone, most of Mainé-Soroa's population survive by farming and stockraising.  As much of the sahel region Niger, Mainé-Soroa farmers work under the threat of desertification.

The town is also known as the birthplace of the former President of Niger, Tanja Mamadou.

Transport

Airport
The town has an airport, international code DRZM, with an unpaved  								3900 ft/1189m runway.

References

Much of the content of this article comes from the equivalent French-language Wikipedia article (retrieved 8 February 2008.)

External links 

Communes of Niger
Diffa Region